Jandala is a village in the Rawalakot, Union Council Bangoin, Tehsil of the Poonch District of Azad Kashmir. It is in the north east of the district, in the hills above the Jhelum Valley. The district was affected by a major earthquake (7.6 on the Richter scale) in October 2005, and suffered from flooding in July 2006.

The main language spoken is Pahari. Schools are the government High School, the Nishter Public School Jandala and the Nishter inter college for girls and boys. Usually the population is served by the Arja Rural Health Center in Bagh. Main tribe of Jandala is Sudhan tribe while other clans are Mughals, Abbasi, Syed, Rajputs and Awan can also be found in the region. 

The main areas of the village include:

References 

Populated places in Poonch District, Pakistan